Vivekrao Vasanthrao Patil (born 1958) is an Indian politician, educator, author and industrialist. Born in Solapur, he is the son of V.L. Patil, a politician and freedom fighter. Vivekrao is the Indian politician. He completed his MBA from Chatrapati Shivaji University, Kolhapur.

He is an elected member of the legislative council and was elected independently with a record victory margin that was the highest in the state since independence. He was elected director of the Karnataka Milk Federation and then elected as the chairman. Vivekrao is a member of the Belgaum Chamber of Commerce, a chairman of the Raibag Sugar Factory and a chairman of the Belgaum District Co-operative bank. He is a Political Strongman in the state.

He runs a chain of over 50 educational institutions in Karnataka, Maharashtra and Goa.

He is a writer and among other things has written several novels. One of them, Dawn to Dust, was a best selling romantic tragedy novel in Europe and India. A Bollywood movie (Dhadkan) was based on it.

References

Karnataka Legislative Council
Regional Commissioner’s office Belgaum
List of elected MLCs, government of Karnataka
 Vivekrao Patil’s bio data on the government of Karnataka website

Vivekrao Patil’s victory is an introspection for congress and a moral defeat for BJP
dawn to dust by vivek patil
Karnataka milk federation 
News article in the Herald Goa
 Indian express news about his father's death
http://phoenixpublicschool.in/Chairman's-Corner.html
KMF chairman Vivekrao Patil launches buffalo milk
link to vivekrao patils photo
Kannada news article stating that only Vivekrao Patil is strong enough to defeat BJP in the Belgaum parliamentary area
Ambedkar’s tallest statue in south India unveiled by Ramesh Jarkiholi and Vivekrao Patil
Vivekrao Patil teaches a fit lesson to the congress party
Vivekrao Patil auditing the Mysore Race club and Zoo as a member of the Karnataka Legislature Audit Committee

1956 births
Living people
People from Solapur
People from Belagavi district
Members of the Karnataka Legislative Council
Businesspeople from Karnataka